The television industry in Turkey includes high-tech program production, transmission and coverage. Turkish Radio and Television Corporation is Turkey's largest and most powerful national television station. As of 1 August 2019, RTÜK states that there a total of 536 television channels in Turkey. Turkey is the world's fastest growing television series exporter and has currently overtaken both Mexico and Brazil as the world's second highest television series exporter after the United States. Turkish television drama has grown in since the early 2000s.

History 

Television in Turkey was introduced in 1952 with the launch of ITU TV. The first television broadcast work carried out as closed-circuit television broadcast in Turkey was prepared in June–July 1966. The first national television channel in Turkey was TRT 1, which was introduced in 1968. Color television was introduced in 1981. Turkey's first private television channel, Star, began broadcasting on 26 May 1989. There was only one television channel controlled by the state until the wave of liberalization in the 1990s which began privately owned broadcasting. Turkey's television market is defined by a handful of large channels, led by Kanal D, ATV and Show, with 14%, 10% and 9.6% market share, respectively.

The two most used reception platforms are terrestrial and satellite, with almost 50% of homes using satellite (and 15% of those pay for services) by the end of 2009. Three services dominate the multi-channel market: the satellite platforms Digitürk and D-Smart and the cable TV service Türksat.

Digital platform 

, pay television services in Turkey include Digiturk, D-Smart, TeleDünya, Vodafone TV, Turkcell TV Plus, Türksat KabloTV and Tivibu.

The Uzan Group launched the first digital television transmissions in Turkey with Turkey's first television channel, Star TV. They also launched Star Digital on Türksat in late 1999. In 2003, the platform's name was changed to DigiFun Club, but the name change was short-lived.

Turkey's first pay television provider, Cine5 from MultiCanal (owned by Erol Aksoy), launched in late 1994. It held the rights to the latest movie premieres, series and especially sports such as the Turkish Football League. In 2000, CINE5 launched CINE+Digital on Turksat with some specialty channels, but this platform was taken down in 2003.

As of 2020 there are 30+ FTA HD broadcasts with all popular and 5 TRT channels are available digitally by satellite and cable.

Digiturk 

Digiturk, owned by the Çukurova Group, was launched in 1999. Digiturk has the rights of airing the main sports live coverage in Turkey with its channel Lig TV. Digiturk is transmitted to the air via the Eutelsat 7 East satellite with the usage of the Türksat 42 East satellite. Digiturk recently launched HD channels of itself such as Lig TV HD, MovieMax HD, Eurosport HD, National Geographic HD, SporMax HD and İZ HD.

Digiturk was endowed to the BeIN Media Group in September 2016.

D-Smart 
Turkey's second digital platform is D-Smart, which is owned by the Dogan Holding. The first HD television broadcasts in Turkey were performed by Dogan Holdinga with the two channels Kanal D HD and Discovery Channel HD on their D-Smart platform. Currently, there are several HD channels available via D-Smart which are Discovery HD, EuroSport HD, HD Smart, Kanal D HD and Star TV HD. Recently, D-Smart has had some deals with Turkey's MTV Group, MCD and the channels of SinemaTV, SinemaTV 2, SinemaTV Aile and SinemaTV HD have begun to be transmitted by D-Smart. D-Smart uses Turksat 42 East for the transmissions.

KabloTV (Cable service) 
KabloTV cable television was introduced in Turkey in 1988. Cable television launched in Turkey in 1991. The cable network was renamed to KabloTV.  KabloTV has some HD channels at the moment, such as National Geographic HD and EuroSport HD. Lately the cable network has had some deals with Turkey's MTV Network Group, MCD, and French television provider ABSAT. KabloTV was expected to introduce more than 100 new television channels in 2009. KabloTV broadcasts via the cable network around the country but it is not widely available, which blocks the system from reaching every part of the land. As of 2020, cable TV infrastructure was available to 24 provinces. Expanding, cable TV infrastructure 81 province completion will activating cable TV services nationwide in 2023.

Analogue switchoff 
Analogue satellite television is still alive in Turkey because the DTV Auction kept getting delayed. But some private companies ended their analog services but the most popular and the Government-owned channel are still running on analog and digital.

Digital terrestrial television 

Turkey's planned digital terrestrial television on 28 August 1998 at Bilkent University. Ankara Dikmen 1,5 kW DVB-T transmitter started test broadcasting on 1 December 2003.

Turkey began digital transmissions in February 2006. The Turkish government was expected to gradually handle the switchover, with a completion date of March 2015. In 2013, the broadcasting regulator awarded a license to a firm; this was cancelled in 2014 after the AYM upheld a complaint against the process. New licenses have been proposed, but as of 2018 Turkey still has no DTT network.

However, with the construction of a new "digital" transmitter in Küçük Çamlıca TV Radio Tower and Çanakkale TV Tower, digital broadcasts finally began testing in 2020. There are plans building up to 40 more transmitters around the country.

DTT auction 
RTÜK's announcement will held in digital terrestrial television tender end of October 2020. But, did not occur.

List of channels

Government channels (TRT - Turkish Radio and Television Corporation)

Private national channels

Most viewed channels
Most viewed channels, January 2023

See also 
Turkish television drama

References

External links 

 Turkish TV Market Information
 Digiturk Sales
 Digiturk Channels

 
Television stations